Savage Harvest is a 1981 American action-adventure natural horror film directed by Robert L. Collins and starring Tom Skerritt, Michelle Phillips, Shawn Stevens, Anne-Marie Martin, Derek Partridge and Tana Helfer.

Plot
A family in Africa is besieged by a pride of ravenous lions, driven to desperation by the drought. They have to survive multiple attacks but some colleagues are eaten by the lions.

Cast
Tom Skerritt as Casey
Michelle Phillips as Maggie
Shawn Stevens as Jon
Anne-Marie Martin as Wendy
Derek Partridge as Derek
Tana Helfer as Kristie
Arthur Malet as MacGruder
Vincent J. Isaac as Jurogi (credited as Vincent Isaac)
Eva Kirrita as Tantsi
Bill Okwirry as Yumadi
Abdulla Sunado as Katinga
Levit Tereria as Asian
Philip Chege as Customs Officer
Greg Odhambo as Wireless Operator
René Le Vant as Alayo

Filming
The production of the film was recorded in Brazil and Kenya.

Cast notes
Tana Helfer, who played the role of daughter Kristie, is the daughter of producer and animal trainer Ralph Helfer.

See also
Roar, a film released in the same year featuring a similar story.

References

External links

1981 films
1981 action films
1980s adventure films
Films about lions
Adventure horror films
American natural horror films
American action adventure films
American action horror films
Films scored by Robert Folk
20th Century Fox films
Films directed by Robert L. Collins
1980s English-language films
1980s American films